Foley are a pop music duo from Auckland, New Zealand. The duo is composed of multi-instrumentalists, songwriters and vocalists Ash Wallace and Gabriel Everett. Foley have been nominated for two Aotearoa Music Awards alongside an APRA Silver Scroll Award. The band has toured with Remi Wolf, and played shows with Tove Lo, Still Woozy, BENEE, Two Door Cinema Club, Flight Facilities.

Members 

 Ash Wallace (2017–present)
 Gabriel Everett (2017–present)

Touring members

 Elijah Whyte – drums, percussion (2017–present)
 Marika Hodgson – bass guitar (2019–2021)
 Holly Webster – bass guitar (2021–present)

Discography

Extended plays

Singles

As featured artist

Remixes

Music videos

Awards

References 

Musical groups from Auckland
Musical groups established in 2017
2017 establishments in New Zealand